Harvey House, also known as the "Coin" Harvey House, is a historic home located at Huntington, Cabell County, West Virginia. It was built in 1874, and is a two-story dwelling reminiscent of houses in New Orleans. It features stained glass windows, a cast iron mantel, and a beamed ceiling in the dining room. It is most notable as the home of William Hope "Coin" Harvey (1851 – 1936).

It was listed on the National Register of Historic Places in 1973.

References

Houses on the National Register of Historic Places in West Virginia
Houses completed in 1874
Houses in Huntington, West Virginia
National Register of Historic Places in Cabell County, West Virginia